The following is a list of Malayalam films released in the year 1980.

Dubbed films

References

 1980
1980
Lists of 1980 films by country or language
Fil